Sir Arthur Harold Marshall  (born 15 September 1931) is a New Zealand expert in acoustics design and research.

He is Professor Emeritus of the University of Auckland School of Architecture, and co-founder of Marshall Day Acoustics Ltd in 1981 with Chris Day. He currently resides in Auckland New Zealand, and continues work with Marshall Day Acoustics as a group consultant.

He is recognised internationally for his contribution to concert hall design, in particular his seminal work with Mike Barron on the importance of lateral reflections.

He has worked on several major concert hall projects including the Guangzhou Opera House with architect Zaha Hadid and the Philharmonie de Paris with French architect Jean Nouvel.

Honours and awards 
Marshall was elected a Fellow of the Royal Society of New Zealand in 1994. He also holds Fellowships in the Acoustical Society of America and the New Zealand Institute of Architects.

In 1995, he was awarded the Wallace Clement Sabine Medal by the Acoustical Society of America for his contributions to the field of architectural acoustics, and design of concert halls. In 2006, he received the Gold Medal of the Acoustical Foundation of India.

In the 2008 Queen's Birthday Honours, Marshall was appointed a Distinguished Companion of the New Zealand Order of Merit, for services to acoustical science. In 2009, following the restoration of titular honours by the New Zealand government, he accepted redesignation as a Knight Companion of the New Zealand Order of Merit.

In 2013, Marshall received the Pickering Medal from the Royal Society of New Zealand. In 2015, he was awarded the Rayleigh Medal by the Institute of Acoustics.

References

External links
Sir Harold Marshall

1931 births
Living people
Academic staff of the University of Auckland
New Zealand acoustical engineers
New Zealand architects
Knights Companion of the New Zealand Order of Merit
Fellows of the Acoustical Society of America
Fellows of the Royal Society of New Zealand